The Prophecy is the second studio album by English Gothic rock band Nosferatu. It is the band's first album to feature lead vocalist Niall Murphy. The album reached Number 14 in the UK Independent Charts in November 1994. It is the band's 2nd best selling album realising in excess of 13,000 copies sold worldwide. The US release contains an extra track titled Sucker for Love. Both European and US version feature a hidden track, The Phantom.In Europe, this album was available on double vinyl as well as CD. Limited Edition promotional cassette versions were distributed free at selected venues. Nosferatu's most famous song The Keepers Call is featured on this album and has gone on to sell over 46,000 copies worldwide.

Track listing

Credits and personnel
Niall Murphy: Vocals & keyboards
Vlad Janicek: Bass Guitar, acoustic guitar, keyboards & drum machine programming
Damien DeVille: Lead Guitar, drum machine programming & keyboards 
Joby Talbot: Saxophone on "Time Of Legends"

1994 albums
Nosferatu (band) albums
Cleopatra Records albums